Orienteering at the 2019 Military World Games was held in Wuhan, China from 19 to 23 October 2019.

Medal summary

Men

Women

Medal table
Source

Controversy 
Chinese orienteering teams comprising both men and women counterparts were disqualified and their results were also rejected by the event organizers citing cheating offenses on the athletes for using illegal secret paths and markings with the assistance of spectators to claim medals in the individual middle distance events. China originally claimed a gold and a silver medal in women's category as well as a silver in men's category prior to the disqualification. The issue was later notified by the International Orienteering Federation and announced officially that the medals won't be counted as part of the multi-sport event and clarified on the disqualification of the Chinese athletes. 

A common protest was also held by the competitors from Russia, Switzerland, France, Belgium, Poland and Austria accusing the Chinese team for gaining major unfair advantage in the competition.

References

External links
Orienteering at the 7th Military World Games
Results book

Cycling
2019
2019